Asmahan Boudjadar is an Algerian athlete competing in the shot put and javelin. She won the gold medal in the F33 shot put at the 2016 Summer Paralympics held in Rio de Janeiro, Brazil.

Career
Asmahan Boudjadar competed in the shot put at the 2015 IPC Athletics World Championships in Doha, Qatar. She threw a no mark in the final, ending in last place. Boudjadar also threw in the javelin, where she set a new F33 world record.

She competed in her first Summer Paralympics in 2016 in Rio de Janeiro, Brazil, later that year. Boudjadar spoke after the event, saying that she felt it was her revenge after the results at the previous World Championships.

References

External links 
 

Living people
Athletes (track and field) at the 2016 Summer Paralympics
Algerian female shot putters
Algerian javelin throwers
Paralympic athletes of Algeria
Paralympic gold medalists for Algeria
Year of birth missing (living people)
Medalists at the 2016 Summer Paralympics
Paralympic medalists in athletics (track and field)
21st-century Algerian women